Bedfordia is a genus of flowering plants belonging to the family Asteraceae. The genus includes 3 species, all endemic to Australia.

Description
Bedfordia are shrubs or small trees. 
Stems and leaves The young branches and lower surface of leaves and the whorl that surrounds the flower heads are densely covered with short matted and stellate hairs.

Leaves grow first on one side and then on the other in two ranks along the branches; not paired.  Leaf edges are entire or with irregular rounded scallops, and have leaf stalks.
Flowers Heads in dense axillary branched cluster which is shorter than the leaves. Flower heads have a flat circular shape; and are surrounded by a hairy bract which is at base. Tubular, bisexual florets, scarcely longer than the bract.

Fruits and reproduction Cylindrical, grooved and not hairy achenes.  Pappus bristles are finely toothed and twice as long as achenes. B. salicina intergrades with B. arborescens (a tree) and B. linearis (a shrub).

Taxonomy
The genus was first formally described by Swiss botanist Augustin Pyramus de Candolle in the second volume of Archives de Botanique in 1833.  The genus name honours John Russell, 6th Duke of Bedford.

Species

Bedfordia arborescens (tree blanket leaf) - eastern Australia
Senecio bedfordii F.Muell
Bedfordia linearis (slender blanket leaf) - Tasmania
Cacalia linearis Labill.
Culcitium lineare (Labill.) Spreng.
Senecio billardierei F.Muell.
Bedfordia salicina DC. (blanket leaf) - Tasmania
Cacalia salicina Labill.
Culcitium salicinum (Labill.) Spreng.

References

Senecioneae
Endemic flora of Australia
Asteraceae genera
Taxa named by Augustin Pyramus de Candolle